Brachycerini is a weevil tribe in the subfamily Brachycerinae.

Genera 
 Brachycerus – Euretus – Progradivus – Theates – Theatomorphus

References 

 Billberg, G.J. 1820: Enumeratio Insectorum in Musaeo Gust. Joh. Billberg. Typis Gadelianis. Stockholm: [2 unn.] + 138 pp.

External links
 
 biolib.cz

Brachycerinae
Beetle tribes
Weevils